Aaron Robert Calver (born 12 January 1996) is an Australian professional football (soccer) player who plays as a defender for Gwangju FC.

Early life
Calver attended Heathcote High School in southern Sydney.

Career 
On 30 December 2012, Calver was called up to the first team for Sydney's New Year's Eve clash against Adelaide United. Calver was substituted on in only the 14th minute of his sides 3–0 loss after Adam Griffiths sustained a leg injury. Aged only sixteen (and having become Sydney's second youngest ever player, behind Terry Antonis), Calver was soon in contention for a position in the starting lineup, with several other defenders in the squad injured.

In the 2014–15 season, Calver spent time playing at right-back, as well as his more customary centre-back role. In February 2015, Calver was slapped by a Western Sydney Wanderers fan after watching the Sydney Derby; he declined to press charges from the incident. In April 2015, Calver signed a new two-year deal with Sydney.

Calver signed with new side Western United for the 2019–20 A-League season. After two seasons with Western United Calver was released.

On 27 March 2022, Calver joined Gwangju FC of K League 2.

Career statistics

Club

Honours 
Sydney
 National Youth League Premiership: 2013–14
 A-League Premiership: 2016–17, 2017–2018
 A-League Championship: 2018–19

Gwangju
 K League 2: 2022

References

External links 
 Aaron Calver profile SydneyFC.com
 

1996 births
Living people
Association football defenders
Australia youth international soccer players
Australian soccer players
A-League Men players
K League 2 players
Sydney FC players
Western United FC players
Perth Glory FC players
Gwangju FC players